Waterfront Records was an independent record label based in Sydney that released recordings by Australian bands during the 1980s and 1990s.

History
Waterfront records was started in 1982 by Steven Stavrakis who at the time was an employee of another independent label Phantom Records. The first release for Waterfront was the Careless Talk Costs Lives EP by JFK & The Cuban Crisis that was originally submitted to, but rejected by, the Phantom label. Stavrakis heard the recordings and when Phantom passed on it he decided to release it himself. Stavrakis was later joined by Chris Dunn who was instrumental in discovering a number of the acts that appeared on the Waterfront label.

Over the next 15 years Waterfront put out over 170 releases. Acts like Tumbleweed and Ratcat who would later have success on the mainstream charts released their first records on Waterfront. Waterfront also licensed some recordings from the Sub Pop label that saw them handling the Australian releases for artist like Nirvana, Henry Rollins, L7 and Tad.

The label later spawned a retail shop also called Waterfront that occupied various locations in the Sydney CBD with the three directors each managing different aspects of the business. Frank Cotterell (retail); Chris Dunn (label/retail) and Stavrakis (label/retail). Stocking local and imported records they gravitated towards a more punk rock aesthetic and were integral in the growth of that scene locally. The shop also regularly hosted live in-store performances. 

After the store closed down in March 2000, Waterfront was reincarnated in February 2003, in the form of online retail store with backing by MGM Distribution, with assistance from former Waterfront Record director Cotterell. Stavrakis is not, and has not ever been, involved in the current entity that is Waterfront Records. At that time the intention was purely to run an online retail service (not a record label).

The "real" Waterfront Records label releases can be identified by the DAMP catalogue number prefix.

Artists released on Waterfront
 The Eastern Dark
 The Happy Hate Me Nots
 The Hard Ons
 The Hellmenn
 John Kennedy's Love Gone Wrong
 Kat Frankie
 The Lonely Hearts
 Massappeal
 Mr Floppy
 Nunbait
 The Pigs
 The Proton Energy Pills
 Ratcat
 The Splatterheads
 The Trilobites
 The Tripps
 The Spunk Bubbles
 Tumbleweed
 Ups and Downs
 Thrust
 The Stupids
 Nirvana
 Vicious Circle

See also
 List of record labels

External links
 

Record labels established in 1982
Australian independent record labels
Alternative rock record labels
1982 establishments in Australia
Record labels based in Sydney